Hesperiphona is a genus in the finch family Fringillidae.

The genus was introduced in 1850 by the French naturalist Charles Lucien Bonaparte with the evening grosbeak as the type species. The name combines the Ancient Greek hesperos meaning "evening" and phōnē meaning "sound" or "cry".

The genus contains two species:

References

 
Bird genera